Final standings of the Hungarian League 1959/1960 season

Final standings

Results

Statistical leaders

Top goalscorers

External links
 IFFHS link

Nemzeti Bajnokság I seasons
1959–60 in Hungarian football
Hun